Samuel Major Gardenhire (1855-1923) was an American novelist and lawyer.

Selected works

References

External links
Works by Samuel Major Gardenhire at the Internet Archive

1855 births
1923 deaths
People from Fayette, Missouri
Writers from Missouri
Writers from New York City
19th-century American novelists
20th-century American novelists